"Les Bicyclettes de Belsize" (translation: "The Bicycles of Belsize")  is a song written and composed by Les Reed and Barry Mason. Used as the theme song of the 1968 eponymous musical film, it was sung by Anthony May in the movie.  As a 7" 45rpm single, it was a big hit that year, in parallel English and French versions, for Engelbert Humperdinck and Mireille Mathieu, respectively.  The French version premiered on Mathieu's 1968 Columbia album Les Bicyclettes de Belsize; the English version premiered as a single in 1968, and was then included on Humperdinck's 1969 album Engelbert.

Notwithstanding the song's French title, it and the rest of the 30-minute film were written in English.  The British short subject is a nominal parody of the French feature film Les Parapluies de Cherbourg, to the extent that one can even sing the words "les parapluies de Cherbourg" to the same music. Though it was produced in 1968, the film was released theatrically in 1969, prompting some to think it was inspired by the song.

Notable releases
 Engelbert Humperdinck  – "Les Bicyclettes de Belsize" / "Three Little Words (I Love You)" - Decca F.12834 - 1968
 Mireille Mathieu - Les Bicyclettes De Belsize/- 1968
 Nada - "Las bicicletas de Belsize" / Sony - 1969
 Alfredo  – "Las bicicletas de Belsize" / Philips - 1969
 Waldo de los Rios  – "Les Bicyclettes de Belsize" / Instrumental
 Nada Trio - "Les Bicyclettes de Belsize" / Olis music 1998
 Marco T  – "Las Bicicletas de Belsize" / Tulsan producciones - 2016

Charts

References

Engelbert Humperdinck songs
Songs about bicycles
Songs about the United Kingdom
1968 singles
Songs written by Les Reed (songwriter)
Songs written by Barry Mason
Decca Records singles
1968 songs
Song recordings produced by Peter Sullivan (record producer)